Lone Wolf is the seventh album by American singer-songwriter Michael Martin Murphey. The album peaked at number 99 on the Billboard 200.

Track listing
 "Nothing Is Your Own" (Murphey) – 4:38
 "Paradise Tonight" (Murphey) – 4:21
 "No Man's Land" (Murphey) – 4:44
 "Loners" (Murphey) – 7:04
 "Song Dog" (Murphey) – 2:53
 "Arrows in the Darkness" (Murphey) – 3:21
 "Hard to Live Together" (Murphey) – 4:29
 "Night Patrol" (Murphey) – 4:17
 "Loving Time" (Murphey) – 4:18
 "Song Dog" (Murphey) – 1:45

Credits
Music
 Michael Martin Murphey – vocals, guitar, piano, harmonica
 Sam Broussard – guitar, background vocals
 Jai Winding – keyboards
 Bill Payne – horn, synthesizer, keyboards
 Dick Hyde – horn
 Steve Madaio – horn
 Jerry Jumonville – horn
 Dennis Christianson – horn
 Earl Lon Price – horn
 Bob Glaub – bass
 Mike Botts – drums
 Robert Greenidge – percussion
 Victor Feldman – percussion
 Wendy Webb – background vocals
 Joey DeLauro – background vocals

Production
 John Boylan – producer, background vocals
 Steve Hodge – engineer
 Paul Grupp – engineer
 Deni King – engineer

References

External links
 Michael Martin Murphey's Official Website

1978 albums
Michael Martin Murphey albums
Albums produced by John Boylan (record producer)
Epic Records albums